The Light in the Clearing is a 1921 American silent drama film directed by T. Hayes Hunter and starring Eugenie Besserer, Clara Horton, and A. Edward Sutherland.

Plot
As described in a film magazine review, Barton Baynes receives a prophesy of four perils and a rosy future from the Silent Woman, while Amos, the son of Ben Grimshaw who was the tightfisted power over the farmers, receives one of death and the gallows. One night Bart meets the Stranger. There is another traveler on the road and it happens that the three come together. Ben sees the flash of a gunshot and the Stanger drops to the road. He sees the assailant comes up and bends over the body. Ben hurls a stone and strikes the assailant in the temple, and then hurries off and spreads the news of what happened. The body turns out to be that of the son of the Silent Woman, and she falls prostrate with grief. Amos is convicted of the crime, and old Ben falls dead with the Old Woman's bony fingers pointed at him. However, Barton's future is bright with the smiles of Sally and success.

Cast

References

Bibliography
 Munden, Kenneth White. The American Film Institute Catalog of Motion Pictures Produced in the United States, Part 1. University of California Press, 1997.

External links
 

1921 films
1921 drama films
1920s English-language films
American silent feature films
Silent American drama films
American black-and-white films
Films directed by T. Hayes Hunter
Films distributed by W. W. Hodkinson Corporation
1920s American films